The Haliç Bridge is a highway bridge on the Golden Horn in Istanbul, Turkey.

Haliç Bridge may also refer to:

 Atatürk Bridge
 Galata Bridge

or:

 Haliç Metro Bridge